On Canaan's Side is a 2011 novel written by Irish playwright and novelist Sebastian Barry.

Plot
The novel is narrated by the 89-year-old Lily Bere, the sister of Annie Dunne (2002) and Willie Dunne from A Long Long Way (2005), and the daughter of the character Thomas Dunne from The Steward of Christendom (1995), as she looks back on her life, having lived through the Irish War of Independence and escaped to Chicago with her boyfriend Tadg Bere. The Cleveland East Ohio Gas explosion of 1944 is referenced within the story and plays an important role in the plot.

Awards and honors
2011 Man Booker Prize, longlist
2012 Walter Scott Prize, winner

References

External links
 Review in The Guardian

2011 Irish novels
Novels by Sebastian Barry
Novels set in Ireland
Novels set in Chicago
Walter Scott Prize-winning works
Faber and Faber books